was a Japanese physician and biologist. He was born in Nagoya.

As a doctor, Ito developed a vaccination against smallpox. He also widely studied the Japanese flora and fauna with Philipp Franz von Siebold, the author of Fauna Japonica and Flora Japonica.  Rhododendron keiskei was named after him.

He wrote a translation of Flora Japonica titled Taisei honzou meiso (Japanese:"泰西本草名疏") that was published in 1829.

Ito became a professor at the University of Tokyo in 1881.

He died in 1901, and he was ennobled with the title of baron (danshaku).

In 1901, botanist William Botting Hemsley named a genus of flowering plants in the willow family, Salicaceae, from China and Vietnam, Itoa in his honour.

Images

References

External links
 
 
 KUL Digital version of Taisei honzou meiso

19th-century Japanese physicians
19th-century Japanese botanists
Japanese naturalists
People from Nagoya
Kazoku
1803 births
1901 deaths